Sweden competed at the 2004 Summer Olympics in Athens, Greece, from 13 to 29 August 2004. This nation has competed at every Summer Olympic Games in the modern era, except for the 1904 Summer Olympics in St. Louis. The Swedish Olympic Committee (SOK) sent the nation's smallest team to the Games since the 1976 Summer Olympics in Montreal. A total of 115 athletes, 62 men and 53 women, competed only in 20 different sports. Women's football was the only team-based sport in which Sweden had its representation at these Games. There was only a single competitor in boxing, diving, artistic gymnastics, judo, modern pentathlon, and rowing.

The Swedish team featured four prominent Olympic medalists: rifle prone shooter Jonas Edman, double trap shooter Pia Hansen, and swimmers Therese Alshammar and defending Olympic champion Lars Frölander, who later became the nation's flag bearer in the opening ceremony. Table tennis players Jörgen Persson and 1996 Olympic champion Jan-Ove Waldner were among the Swedish athletes to compete in fifth Olympics, since the sport had been formally included into the Olympic program in 1988. Notable Swedish athletes also included sprint kayak pair Henrik Nilsson and Markus Oscarsson, Greco-Roman wrestler Ara Abrahamian, who emigrated from his native Armenia to compete for the Swedish team, and tennis player Robin Söderling, the youngest male athlete of the team.

Sweden left Athens with a total of seven Olympic medals, four golds, two silver, and one bronze, matching its gold medal tally with Munich (1972), Montreal (1976), and Sydney (2000). Three individual Swedish athletes had won Olympic gold medals in athletics: Stefan Holm in men's high jump, Christian Olsson in men's triple jump, and Carolina Klüft in women's heptathlon. Meanwhile, sprint kayak pair Nilsson and Oscarsson picked up their first Olympic title in men's K-2 1000 metres, following their silver medal triumph in Sydney four years earlier.

Medalists

Archery

Three Swedish archers qualified each for the men's individual archery, and a spot for the men's team.

Athletics

Swedish athletes have so far achieved qualifying standards in the following athletics events (up to a maximum of 3 athletes in each event at the 'A' Standard, and 1 at the 'B' Standard).

Men
Track & road events

Field events

Women
Track & road events

Field events

Combined events – Heptathlon

Badminton

Boxing

Sweden sent a single boxer to Athens.

Canoeing

Sprint

Qualification Legend: Q = Qualify to final; q = Qualify to semifinal

Cycling

Road
Men

Women

Mountain biking

Diving

Sweden has qualified a single diver.

Equestrian

Because only three horse and rider pairs from each nation could advance beyond certain rounds in the individual events, five American pairs did not advance despite being placed sufficiently high.  They received rankings below all pairs that did advance.

Dressage

Eventing

Show jumping

Football

Summary

Women's tournament

Roster

Group play

Quarter-final

Semi-final

Bronze medal match

Gymnastics

Artistic
Women

Judo

Modern pentathlon

One Swedish athlete qualified to compete in the modern pentathlon event through the European Championships.

Rowing

Swedish rowers qualified the following boats:

Women

Qualification Legend: FA=Final A (medal); FB=Final B (non-medal); FC=Final C (non-medal); FD=Final D (non-medal); FE=Final E (non-medal); FF=Final F (non-medal); SA/B=Semifinals A/B; SC/D=Semifinals C/D; SE/F=Semifinals E/F; R=Repechage

Sailing

Swedish sailors have qualified one boat for each of the following events.

Men

Women

Open

M = Medal race; OCS = On course side of the starting line; DSQ = Disqualified; DNF = Did not finish; DNS= Did not start; RDG = Redress given

Shooting

Eight Swedish shooters (seven men and one woman) qualified to compete in the following events:

Men

Women

Swimming

Swedish swimmers earned qualifying standards in the following events (up to a maximum of 2 swimmers in each event at the A-standard time, and 1 at the B-standard time):

Men

Women

Table tennis

Three Swedish table tennis players qualified for the following events.

Tennis 

Sweden nominated four male tennis players to compete in the tournament.

Men

Volleyball

Beach

Wrestling

Men's Greco-Roman

Women's freestyle

See also
 Sweden at the 2004 Summer Paralympics

References

External links
Official Report of the XXVIII Olympiad
Swedish Olympic Committee 

Nations at the 2004 Summer Olympics
2004
Summer Olympics